Queen of Siam is the debut solo album American artist Lydia Lunch, released on February 9, 1980 by record label ZE. It features Jack Ruby on bass, Douglas Bowne on drums, and Pat Irwin on saxophone, piano and everything else. The Billy Ver Planck Orchestra (Jazz for Playboys, Jazz for Playgirls) perform on four of the tracks.

Track listing

Personnel

Lydia Lunch – vocals, guitar on "Tied and Twist" and "Carnival Fat Man", piano on "Carnival Fat Man", arrangements, production
Dougie Bowne – drums
Pat Irwin – backing vocals, instruments, arrangement
Robert Quine – guitar on "Lady Scarface", "A Cruise to the Moon", "Knives in the Drain" and "Blood of Tin"
Jack Ruby (George Scott III) – bass guitar
J. Billy Ver Planck – arrangements with Billy Ver Planck Orchestra on "Lady Scarface", "A Cruise to the Moon", "Knives in the Drain" and "Blood of Tin"
Technical
Bob Blank – production, mixing, recording
Michael Zilkha - executive producer
George DuBose - photography

References

External links 

 

1980 debut albums
Lydia Lunch albums
ZE Records albums